"Je serai (ta meilleure amie)" is the name of a 2001 song recorded by the French singer Lorie. It was released on 30 October 2001 as second single from her debut album Près de Toi, on which it features as third track. It achieved success in Belgium (Wallonia) and France, but its sales and positions on charts were hugeless in comparison with those of the previous single, "Près de moi".

Song information
The song, who deals with the friendship between the singer and her best female friend, was composed and produced by Johnny Williams and Louis Element. The music video was shot in Mexico and was directed by Vincent Egret. Lorie's real-life best friend took part in the filming. In an interview aired in 2021, Lorie explains that the shooting of the music video was extremely difficult from the extreme weather in the Mexican jungle to the September 11 attacks that considerably delayed the release of the music video. 

Lorie performed the song during her first tour ; as a result, the song was included in a live version on her 2003 album Live Tour, as the 13th track. It also features on Lorie's 2005 best of just entitled Best of (11th track), and on many French compilations, such as Just Girls.

Chart performances
The song debuted at number five on the French Singles Chart, on 17 November 2001. It peaked at this position for four non consecutive weeks and remained in the top ten for 12 weeks. Then it dropped on the chart and totaled 20 weeks in the top 50 and 22 weeks on the chart (top 100). It finally achieved Gold status and was ranked respectively 37th and 58th on the 2001 and 2002 End of the Year Charts.

In Belgium (Wallonia), the single charted for twenty weeks from 1 December 2001. It entered at number 29, reached the top ten two weeks later and hit number five for two weeks. It remained for ten weeks in the top ten. It was certified Gold disc and was number 68 on the Annual Chart.

The song ranked for eight weeks on the Swiss Singles Chart, peaking at number 25 in the first week, on 27 January 2002.

Track listings
 CD single
 "Je serai (ta meilleure amie)" (radio edit) — 3:28
 "Je serai (ta meilleure amie)" (groove radio remix) — 3:24

 CD single - Limited edition
 "Je serai (ta meilleure amie)" (radio edit) — 3:28
 "Je serai (ta meilleure amie)" (groove radio remix) — 3:24
+ Poster

 Digital download
 "Je serai (ta meilleure amie)" (radio edit) — 3:28
 "Je serai (ta meilleure amie)" (radio edit) (second version) — 4:21
 "Je serai (ta meilleure amie)" (radio edit) (live) — 5:20

Charts and sales

Peak positions

Year-end charts

Certifications and sales

References

2001 singles
Lorie (singer) songs
Songs written by Louis Element
2001 songs